John A. Atwood (May 21, 1850–August  31, 1930) was an American businessman and politician.

Atwood was born in the province of Ontario, Canada. He lived in Stillman Valley, Illinois and went to the public schools. He was involved in the insurance business. Atwood also worked as an embalmer in the funeral home business. He served as a township assessor and as a justice of the peace. Atwood served on the board of trustees for the State Training School for Girls in Geneva, Illinois. He was a Republican. Atwood served in the Illinois House of Representatives from 1911 to 1917 and in the Illinois Senate from 1917 to 1921. Atwood was the editor and publisher of the Stillman Valley Graphic newspaper. Henry Andrus, who also served in the Illinois General Assembly, was Atwood's brother in law; Andrus's wife was Atwood's sister. He died in Rockford, Illinois.

Notes

1850 births
1930 deaths
Pre-Confederation Canadian emigrants to the United States
People from Stillman Valley, Illinois
Businesspeople from Illinois
Editors of Illinois newspapers
School board members in Illinois
Republican Party members of the Illinois House of Representatives
Republican Party Illinois state senators